NADH dehydrogenase [ubiquinone] iron-sulfur protein 3, mitochondrial is an enzyme that in humans is encoded by the NDUFS3 gene on chromosome 11. This gene encodes one of the iron-sulfur protein (IP) components of mitochondrial NADH:ubiquinone oxidoreductase (complex I). Mutations in this gene are associated with Leigh syndrome resulting from mitochondrial complex I deficiency.

Structure 

The NDUFS3 gene encodes a protein subunit consisting of 263 amino acids. This protein is synthesized in the cytoplasm and then transported to the mitochondria via a signal peptide. Two mutations that occur in its highly conserved C-terminal region, T145I and R199W, are causally linked to Leigh syndrome and optic atrophy. Nonetheless, despite its crucial biological role, the human NDUFS3 remains structurally poorly understood.

Function 

This gene encodes one of the iron-sulfur protein (IP) components of complex I. The 45-subunit NADH:ubiquinone oxidoreductase (complex I) is the first enzyme complex in the electron transport chain of mitochondria. As a catalytic subunit, NDUFS3 plays a vital role in the proper assembly of complex I and is recruited to the inner mitochondrial membrane to form an early assembly intermediate with NDUFS2. It initiates the assembly of complex I in the mitochondrial matrix.

Cleavage of NDUFS3 by GzmA has been observed to activate a programmed cell death pathway which results in mitochondrial dysfunction and reactive oxygen species (ROS) generation.

Clinical significance 

Mutations in the NDUFS3 gene are associated with Mitochondrial Complex I Deficiency, which is autosomal recessive. This deficiency is the most common enzymatic defect of the oxidative phosphorylation disorders. Mitochondrial complex I deficiency shows extreme genetic heterogeneity and can be caused by mutation in nuclear-encoded genes or in mitochondrial-encoded genes. There are no obvious genotype-phenotype correlations, and inference of the underlying basis from the clinical or biochemical presentation is difficult, if not impossible. However, the majority of cases are caused by mutations in nuclear-encoded genes. It causes a wide range of clinical disorders, ranging from lethal neonatal disease to adult-onset neurodegenerative disorders. Phenotypes include macrocephaly with progressive leukodystrophy, nonspecific encephalopathy, hypertrophic cardiomyopathy, myopathy, liver disease, Leigh syndrome, Leber hereditary optic neuropathy, and some forms of Parkinson disease.

NDUFS3 has also been implicated in breast cancer and ductal carcinoma and, thus, may serve as a novel biomarker for tracking cancer progression and invasiveness.

Model organisms 

Model organisms have been used in the study of NDUFS3 function. A conditional knockout mouse line, called Ndufs3tm1a(EUCOMM)Wtsi was generated as part of the International Knockout Mouse Consortium program—a high-throughput mutagenesis project to generate and distribute animal models of disease to interested scientists.

Male and female animals underwent a standardized phenotypic screen to determine the effects of deletion. 
Twenty five tests were carried out on mutant mice and six significant abnormalities were observed.  No homozygous mutant embryos were identified during gestation, and therefore none survived until weaning. The remaining tests were carried out on heterozygous mutant adult mice; males had an increased lean body mass and heart weight, and a decrease in some plasma chemistry and haematology  parameters.

See also 

NDUFS1

References

Further reading 

 
 
 
 
 
 
 
 
 
 
 
 
 

Human proteins
EC 3.1.3
Genes mutated in mice